William Stewart (born 1844, date of death unknown) was an Australian cricketer. He played one first-class cricket match for Victoria in 1861.

See also
 List of Victoria first-class cricketers

References

1844 births
Year of death missing
Australian cricketers
Victoria cricketers
Place of birth missing